The Gideon C. Hixon House is a historic residence built in 1859 and located in La Crosse, Wisconsin.  The house was built for Gideon Hixon, a partner in a lumber business. Hixon would later become a founder and president of the La Cross National Bank and would serve in the state legislature.  The house was added to the National Register of Historic Places in 1974.

Architecture

The two-story Italianate room house was built in 1859.  Made of clapboard, the house features a shallow pitch roof with a substantial overhand and carved wooden brackets.  The rather modest exterior is offset by the more richly appointed interior, furnished with artifacts acquired by the wealthy Mr. Hixon during national and overseas travel.

Additions were made to the house in 1870 and again in the early 1880s.  The house is owned by the La Crosse County Historical Society and has been restored and maintained as it existed at the end of the 19th century.

See also
The Freight House

References

Buildings and structures in La Crosse, Wisconsin
Houses in La Crosse County, Wisconsin
Houses on the National Register of Historic Places in Wisconsin
Museums in La Crosse County, Wisconsin
Historic house museums in Wisconsin
Italianate architecture in Wisconsin
Houses completed in 1859
National Register of Historic Places in La Crosse County, Wisconsin